Yacine Adli (born 29 July 2000) is a French professional footballer who plays as an attacking midfielder for  club AC Milan.

Club career

Paris Saint-Germain
Adli made his professional debut for Paris Saint-Germain (PSG) on 19 May 2018 in the final Ligue 1 match of the season against Caen. He replaced Christopher Nkunku after 83 minutes in a 0–0 away draw. On 2 July 2018, Adli signed his first professional contract with PSG.

Bordeaux
On 31 January 2019, the last day of the 2018–19 winter transfer window, Adli joined league rivals Bordeaux on a -year contract. The transfer reportedly involved a fee of €5.5 million and a 40% sell-on clause.

Adli scored against his former side Paris Saint-Germain in a 2–2 draw at the Parc des Princes on 28 November 2020.

AC Milan 
On 31 August 2021, it was announced that Adli had signed for Serie A giants AC Milan on a five-year contract. The fee paid to Bordeaux was a reported €8 million. He was loaned back to the club for the remainder of the 2021–22 season.

International career
Adli was born in France to Algerian parents. He is a youth international for France, and represented the France U17s at the 2017 UEFA European Under-17 Championship and the 2017 FIFA U-17 World Cup.

Career statistics

References

External links

 Profile at the AC Milan website
 
 
 

2000 births
Living people
People from Vitry-sur-Seine
Footballers from Val-de-Marne
French footballers
France youth international footballers
Association football midfielders
Paris Saint-Germain F.C. players
FC Girondins de Bordeaux players
A.C. Milan players
Ligue 1 players
Championnat National 2 players

French sportspeople of Algerian descent
French expatriate footballers
Expatriate footballers in Italy
French expatriate sportspeople in Italy